Gilbert C. Bartosh Sr. (May 21, 1930 – June 4, 2016) was an American football player and coach.  He served as the head football coach at the University of Texas at El Paso (UTEP) from 1974 to 1976, compiling a record of 6–28.

Considered the greatest player ever to come out of Granger, Bartosh was dubbed the "Granger Ghost." He starred at Granger from 1945 to 48 before a four-year career at Texas Christian University (TCU), where he played quarterback under coach Dutch Meyer and led the Southwest Conference in total offense his junior season in 1951, when he was also named an All-American. In 1952 however, he had to take a backseat behind Ray McKown. Bartosh was drafted by the Baltimore Colts as the 314th Pick (Round 27) of the 1952 NFL Draft, but never played in the NFL. He did play for the British Columbia Lions in 1955 (leading the team in touchdowns).

After suffering a shoulder injury during one of his practices he quit pro football and started his coaching career. Bartosh was the head football coach at Milby High School in Houston, Texas from 1959 to 1961, winning two District Championships. In 1962, he became head coach at the newly opened Lee High School, Houston, serving there through the 1966 season.  His 1964 and 1965 teams were zone champions.  After a three-year stint as assistant at Rice University, he became head coach at Permian High School in Odessa, Texas in 1971. Bartosh guided Permian to a perfect 14–0 season in 1972, winning the Texas 5A state championship as well as the mythical high school football national championship along the way. He then left Permian for an assistant coaching job under Emory Bellard at Texas A&M University. In 1974, he succeeded Tommy Hudspeth as head coach at UTEP.

Bartosh was inducted into the Texas High School Football Hall of Fame in 1989. He died on June 4, 2016 in Liberty Hill, Texas where he lived.

Head coaching record

College

References

1930 births
2016 deaths
American football quarterbacks
American players of Canadian football
BC Lions players
Rice Owls football coaches
New Mexico Lobos football coaches
TCU Horned Frogs football players
Texas A&M Aggies football coaches
UTEP Miners football coaches
High school football coaches in Texas
People from Granger, Texas
People from Liberty Hill, Texas
Players of American football from Texas